Francis Harold Whitty (26 April 1905 – 18 October 2001) was an Australian rules footballer who played with Hawthorn in the Victorian Football League (VFL).

A follower who was recruited from New South Wales, Whitty played eleven VFL games for Hawthorn before transferring to Camberwell in June 1930 and then moved on to Brighton in 1931.

Notes

External links 

1929 - Hawthorn FC Team Photo

1905 births
2001 deaths
Australian rules footballers from New South Wales
Hawthorn Football Club players
Camberwell Football Club players
Brighton Football Club players